Pycnonuclear fusion is a type of nuclear fusion reaction which occurs due to zero-point oscillations of nuclei around their equilibrium point bound in their crystal lattice. In quantum physics, the phenomenon can be interpreted as overlap of the wave functions of neighboring ions, and is proportional to the overlapping amplitude. Under the conditions of above-threshold ionization, the reactions of neutronization and pycnonuclear fusion can lead to the creation of absolutely stable environments in superdense substances.

The term "pycnonuclear" was coined by A.G.W. Cameron in 1959, but research showing the possibility of nuclear fusion in extremely dense and cold compositions was published by W. A. Wildhack in 1940.

Astrophysics 
Pycnonuclear reactions can occur anywhere and in any matter, but under standard conditions, the speed of the reaction is exceedingly low, and thus, have no significant role outside of extremely dense systems, neutron-rich and free electron-rich environments, such as the inner crust of a Neutron star. A feature of pycnonuclear reactions is that the rate of the reaction is directly proportional to the density of the space that the reaction is occurring in, but is almost fully independent of the temperature of the environment.

The pycnonuclear reactions occurred most violently in the initial phases of the universe, as the baryonic matter was a billion times denser than today. Pycnonuclear reactions are still observed today in neutron stars or white dwarfs, with evidence present of them occurring in lab-generated deuterium-tritium plasma. Some speculations also relate the fact that Jupiter emits more radiation than it receives from the Sun with pycnonuclear reactions or cold fusion.

Black dwarfs

White dwarfs 
In white dwarfs, the core of the star is cold, under which conditions, so, if treated classically, the nuclei that arrange themselves into a crystal lattice are in their ground state. The zero-point oscillations of nuclei in the crystal lattice with energy at the energy  at Gamow's peak equal to  can overcome the Coulomb barrier, actuating pycnonuclear reactions. A semi-analytical model indicates that in white dwarfs, a thermonuclear runaway can occur at much earlier ages than that of the universe, as the pycnonuclear reactions in the cores of white dwarfs exceed the luminosity of the white dwarfs, allowing C-burning to occur, which catalyzes the formation of type Ia supernovas in accreting white dwarfs, whose mass is equal to the Chandrasekhar mass.

Some studies indicate that the contribution of pycnonuclear reactions towards instability of white dwarfs is only significant in carbon white dwarfs, while in oxygen white dwarfs, such instability is caused mostly due to electron capture. Although other authors disagree that the pycnonuclear reactions can act as major long-term heating sources for massive (1.25 ) white dwarfs, as their density would not suffice for a high rate of pycnonuclear reactions.

While most studies indicate that at the end of their lifecycle, white dwarfs slowly decay into black dwarfs, where pycnonuclear reactions slowly turn their cores into ^56Fe, according to some versions, a collapse of black dwarfs is possible: M.E. Caplan (2020) theorizes that in the most massive black dwarfs (1.25 ), due to their declining electron fraction resulting from ^56Fe production, they will exceed the Chandrasekhar limit in the very far future, speculating that their lifetime and delay time can stretch to up to  years.

Neutron stars 

As the neutron stars undergo accretion, the density in the crust increases, passing the electron capture threshold. As the electron capture threshold ( g cm−3) is exceeded, it allows for the formation of light nuclei from the process of double electron capture (^40Mg + 2e -> ^34Ne + 6n + ), forming the light neon nuclei and free neutrons, which further increases the density of the crust.  As the density increases, the crystal lattices of neutron-rich nuclei are forced closer together due to gravitational collapse of accreting material, and at a point where the nuclei are pushed so close together that their zero-point oscillations allow them to break through the Coulomb barrier, fusion occurs. While the main site of pycnonuclear fusion within neutron stars is the inner crust, pycnonuclear reactions between light nuclei can occur even in the plasma ocean. Since the core of neutron stars was approximated to be  g cm−3, at such extreme densities, pycnonuclear reactions play a large role as demonstrated by Haensel & Zdunik, who showed that at densities of  g cm−3, they serve as a major heat source. In the fusion processes of the inner crust, the burning of neutron-rich nuclei (^{34}Ne + ^{34}Ne -> ^68Ca) releases a lot of heat, allowing pycnonuclear fusion to perform as a major energy source, possibly even acting as an energy basin for gamma-ray bursts.

Further studies have established that most magnetars are found at densities of g cm−3, indicating that pycnonuclear reactions along with subsequent electron capture reactions could serve as major heat sources.

Triple-alpha reaction 

In  Wolf–Rayet stars, the triple-alpha reaction is accommodated by the low-energy of ^8Be resonance. However, in neutron stars the temperature in the core is so low that the triple-alpha reactions can occur via the pycnonuclear pathway.

Mathematical model 

As the density increases, the Gamow peak increases in height and shifts towards lower energy, while the potential barriers are depressed. The material becomes a degenerate gas at such densities. Harrison proposed that models fully independent of temperature be called cryonuclear.

Pycnonuclear reactions can proceed in two ways: direct (^{34}Ne + ^{34}Ne or ^{40}Mg + ^{40}Mg) or through chain of electron capture reactions (^25N + ^40Mg).

Uncertainties 
The current consensus on the rate of pycnonuclear reactions is not coherent. There are currently a lot of uncertainties to consider when modelling the rate of pycnonuclear reactions, especially in spaces with high numbers of free particles. The primary focus of current research is on the effects of crystal lattice deformation and the presence of free neutrons on the reaction rate. Every time fusion occurs, nuclei are removed from the crystal lattice - creating a defect. The difficulty of approximating this model lies within the fact that the further changes occurring to the lattice and the effect of various deformations on the rate are thus far unknown. Since neighbouring lattices can affect the rate of reaction too, negligence of such deformations could lead to major discrepancies. Another confounding variable would be the presence of free neutrons in the crusts of neutron stars. The presence of free neutrons could potentially affect the Coulomb barrier, making it either taller or thicker. A study published by D.G. Yakovlev in 2006 has shown that the rate calculation of the first pycnonuclear fusion of two ^{34}Ne nuclei in the crust of a neutron star can have an uncertainty magnitude of up to seven. In this study, Yakovlev also highlighted the uncertainty in the threshold of pycnonuclear fusion (e.g., at what density it starts), giving the approximate density required for the start of pycnonuclear fusion of g cm−3, arriving at a similar conclusion as Haesnel and Zdunik. According to Haesnel and Zdunik, additional uncertainty of rate calculations in neutron stars can also be due to uneven distribution of the crustal heating, which can impact the thermal states of neutron stars before and after accretion.

In white dwarfs and neutron stars, the nuclear reaction rates can not only be affected by pycnonuclear reactions but also by the plasma screening of the Coulomb interaction. A Ukrainian Electrodynamic Research Laboratory "Proton-21", established that by forming a thin electron plasma layer on the surface of the target material, and, thus, forcing the self-compression of the target material at low temperatures, they could stimulate the process of pycnonuclear fusion. The startup of the process was due to the self-contracting plasma "scanning" the entire volume of the target material, screening the Coulumb field.

Nuclear fusion regimes 
Due to the difficulty of classifying various nuclear fusions into either thermonuclear or pycnonuclear, Salpeter proposed a concept of fusion "regimes", classifying all nuclear fusion into five types. Two thermonuclear with weak and strong plasma screening, intermediate regime, temperature-enhanced pycnonuclear regime and zero-temperature pycnonuclear regime.

One-component plasma 
The rate equation for one-component plasma - OCP has been determined by many authors, Salpeter & Van-Horn being pioneers in this area. Their rate approximation revolves around the calculation of the quantum tunnelling probability of an ion coupled in a BCC crystal lattice using the WKB approximation to the relative wave function of the fusing nuclei, with considerations to the response of the lattice - two Coulomb barrier penetration models were assumed, the static lattice and a relaxed lattice. In a static lattice model, the surrounding nuclei bound in their crystal lattice remain unchanged during tunnelling. The biggest downside of Salpeter & Van-Horn approximations was that they did not consider the dynamic model - where the polarization of the lattice as a result of quantum tunnelling is taken into account, neglecting the parameter for the curvature of trajectories of reacting ions. Schramm and Koonin improved their OCP model in 1990 when the dynamic lattice model was considered.

The primary differences between the Salpeter & Van-Horn and Schramm and Koonin methods are the treatment of the Coulomb repulsion of the fusing nuclei and the consideration of the polarization of the lattice, which is a negatively contributing effect to the rate of pycnonuclear reactions. The energy difference in a fully relaxed model in Salpter & Van-Horn approximation was calculated by subtraction of the Wigner–Seitz spheres of the initial and fused states, which gave a rough approximate as the polyhyderal lattice was simplified down to a sphere. Using the Wigner-Seitz approximation, the Coulomb energy would become: , with an error factor of 1.00454, making the WS approximation sufficiently accurate for Salpeter's calculations, rather than using the complex model proposed by Carr. The solution proposed by Schramm and Koonin included an exact calculation, which makes their model more accurate. In their model, they found that while the dynamic model cannot be neglected, it is possible that the effects caused by it can be cancelled out.

Zero-temperature pycnonuclear regime 
Using the 3-dimensional WKB approximation described by Van Horn-Salpeter in 1967, they approximated the wave function at the nuclear surface:. SV arrived at  reactions cm−3 sec−1.

Schramm and Koonin have performed their calculations around degenerate ^4He gas at a density g cm−3.

Thermally-enhanced pycnonuclear regime 
Salpeter concluded that in intermediate cases, the rate of pycnonuclear reactions is simply equal to the rate of thermonuclear reactions, but with factored in parameters of weak-screening correction factor , where  multiplied by the rate.

Multi-component plasma 
The current latest rate approximation in multi-component plasma - MCP (matter containing nuclei of different types) has been published by Yakovlev et al. (2006). In this study, Yakovlev discusses the behaviour of fusion reactions in MCP in both thermonuclear and pycnonuclear regimes. He, nevertheless, still presents a simplified version of MCP calculations, based on generalizations and similarities to other methods, and his methodology is more of an extrapolation of OCP calculations into MCP calculations.

Zero-temperature pycnonuclear regime 
In such conditions, the plasma ions are performing zero-point oscillations within the crystal structure, strongly held together by Coulomb forces, all thermal effects are negligible. The parameter of coupling is the ratio of the electrostatic energy of the ion and its thermal energy (e.g., Coulomb energy vs thermal energy). This concept was extrapolated by Yakovlev from one-component plasma calculations, and is defined as:

, where

  is the temperature,
  is the Boltzmann constant,
 is the electron sphere radius,
  is the ion-sphere radius.
By adapting the approach presented by Salpeter & Van-Horn, Yakovlev et al. came to an expression of rate of pycnonuclear reactions for MCP:

, where

  is the number of nearest nuclei around nucleus ,
  is the statistical averaging over a range of an ensemble of pairs,
  is the Kronecker delta,
  is the number density of the nucleus 

In case of direct pycnonuclear reactions, the rate depends on the value of  exponentially.

See also 

 Cold fusion
 Thermonuclear reaction
 Accretion (astrophysics)

References 

Nuclear fusion
Neutron sources
Astronomy